The following is a list of sportscasters who have served as commentators for Monday Night Football broadcasts on various networks, along with each commentator's period of tenure on the show (beginning years of each season shown, as the NFL season ends in the calendar year after it begins).  Game announcers used in #2 games usually come from ESPN and are included for both wild card playoff games (1995–2005 except 2002–2003 season) and secondary regular season games (1987, 1997, 2005–present).

Television

ABC

Play-by-play announcers
 Keith Jackson (1970)
 Frank Gifford (1971–1985; also when Al Michaels was working postseason baseball 1986–1989)
 Al Michaels (1986–2005)
 Gary Bender (#2, 1987)
 Mike Patrick (#2, 1997 and 2005)

Color commentators
 Howard Cosell (1970–1983)
 Don Meredith (1970–1973, 1977–1984)
 Fred Williamson (1974 preseason only)
 Alex Karras (1974–1976)
 Fran Tarkenton (1979–1982)
 O. J. Simpson (1983–1985)
 Joe Namath (1985)
 Frank Gifford (1986–1997)
 Lynn Swann (#2, 1986-1987)
 Dan Dierdorf (1987–1998)
 Joe Theismann (#2, 1997 and 2005)
 Boomer Esiason (1998–1999)
 Dan Fouts (2000–2001)
 Dennis Miller (2000–2001)
 John Madden (2002–2005)
 Paul Maguire (#2, 2005)

Sideline reporters
 Lynn Swann (1994–1997, Super Bowls)
 Ron Jaworski (#2, 1997)
 Lesley Visser (1998–1999 and during Wild Card playoffs and Super Bowl XXXIV)
 Eric Dickerson (2000–2001)
 Melissa Stark (2000–2002)
 Lisa Guerrero (2003)
 Michele Tafoya (2004–2005)
 Sam Ryan (2005)
 Suzy Kolber (2005; Super Bowl XL)

Studio hosts
 Jim Lampley (halftime and Super Bowl XIX co-host)
 Al Michaels (Super Bowl XIX co-host)
 Keith Jackson (Super Bowl XXII host)
 Chris Berman (halftime host, 1996–2005 and during Wild Card playoffs and Super Bowls)
 Mike Tirico (Super Bowl)
 Brent Musburger (studio host, 1990–1995)
 Robin Roberts (Hurricane Katrina telethon co-host, 2005)

Studio analysts
 Dick Vermeil (playoffs and Super Bowl, 1990–1995)
 Boomer Esiason (playoffs and Super Bowl XXIX)
 Joe Theismann (Super Bowl XIX)
 Peter King (1995)
 Frank Gifford (1998)
 Steve Young (playoffs and Super Bowl)
 Brian Billick (playoffs and Super Bowl XXXVII)
 Michael Strahan (playoffs and Super Bowl XXXVII)
 Tom Jackson (playoffs and Super Bowl XL)
 Michael Irvin (playoffs and Super Bowl XL)
 Chris Mortensen (playoffs and Super Bowl XL)
 Bill Belichick (Super Bowl XL)

Wild Card Playoffs (No. 2 game)

Play-by-play announcers
 Brent Musburger (1990–1995, 2002)
 Mike Patrick (1996–2001, 2003–2005)

Color commentators
 Dick Vermeil (1990–1995)
 Joe Theismann (1996–2001, 2003–2005)
 Paul Maguire (1998–2001, 2003–2005)
 Gary Danielson (2002)

Sideline reporters
 Lesley Visser (1990-1997)
 Solomon Wilcots (1998–2000)
 Suzy Kolber (2001, 2003-2005)
 Jack Arute (2002)

ESPN

Play-by-play announcers
 Mike Tirico (2006–2015)
 Sean McDonough (2016–2017)
 Joe Tessitore (2018–2019)
 Steve Levy (2020–2021)
 Joe Buck (2022–present)

Color commentators
 Tony Kornheiser (2006–2008)
 Joe Theismann (2006)
 Ron Jaworski (2007–2011)
 Jon Gruden (2009–2017)
 Matt Hasselbeck (2018 Pro Bowl)
 Booger McFarland (2018–2019)
 Jason Witten (2018)
 Brian Griese (2020–2021)
 Louis Riddick (2020–2021)
 Troy Aikman (2022–present)

Sideline reporters
 Michele Tafoya (2006–2010)
 Suzy Kolber (2006–2010, 2011 Week 2, 5, 6, 11, 16)
 Wendi Nix (fill-in, 2011 Week 1, 4, 12)
 Rachel Nichols (fill-in, 2011 Week 5, 8-10, 14)
 Sal Paolantonio (fill-in, 2011 Week 7, 13)
 Laura Rutledge (fill-in, 2020 Week 16)
 John Sutcliffe (fill-in, 2011 Week 15)
 Ed Werder (fill-in, 2011 Week 3)
 Lisa Salters (2012–present)

Rules analysts
 Gerald Austin (2012–2017)
 Jeff Triplette (2018)
 John Parry (2019–present)

Studio hosts
 Chris Berman (2006–2016)
 Stuart Scott (2007–2014)
 Suzy Kolber (2014–present)

Studio analysts
 Michael Irvin (2006)
 Tom Jackson (2006-2015)
 Steve Young (2006–present)
 Keyshawn Johnson (2007-2015)
 Bill Parcells (2007)
 Emmitt Smith (2007-2008)
 Cris Carter (2008-2015)
 Mike Ditka (2008-2015)
 Matt Millen (2009-2010)
 Trent Dilfer (2011-2016)
 Ray Lewis (2013-2015)
 Matt Hasselbeck (2016-2018)
 Charles Woodson (2016-2018)
 Randy Moss (2017–2021)
 Louis Riddick (2019)
 Adam Schefter (2019–present)
 Booger McFarland (2020–present)
 Alex Smith (2020–present)
 Robert Griffin III (2022-present)

No. 2 teams

Play-by-play announcers
 Brad Nessler (2006, 2010–2011)
 Mike Greenberg (2007–2009)
 Chris Berman (2012–2016)
 Beth Mowins (2017–2018)
 Steve Levy (2019, 2022–present)
 Chris Fowler (2020–2021)

Color commentators
 Ron Jaworski (2006)
 Dick Vermeil  (2006)
 Mike Ditka (2007–2008)
 Mike Golic (2007–2009)
 Steve Young (2009, 2016)
 Trent Dilfer (2010–2015)
 Rex Ryan (2017)
 Brian Griese (2018–2019)
 Louis Riddick (2019, 2022–present)
 Kirk Herbstreit (2020–2021)
 Dan Orlovsky (2022–present)

Sideline reporters
 Bonnie Bernstein (2006–2007)
 Suzy Kolber (2008-2010)
 Rachel Nichols (2011–2012)
 Sal Paolantonio (2013)
 Lindsay Czarniak (2014–2016)
 Sergio Dipp (2017)
 Laura Rutledge (2018, 2021–present)
 Dianna Russini (2019)
 Maria Taylor (2020)

ESPN Deportes/ESPN Latin America
 Álvaro Martín (play-by-play, 2006–present)
 Raul Allegre (color commentator, 2006–present)
 Eduardo Varela (#2 play-by-play, 2006–present)
 Ciro Procuna (#3 play-by-play, 2006)
 Sergio Dipp (sideline reporter, 2013–present)

Radio

CBS Radio/Westwood One

 Marv Albert (play-by-play, 2002–2009)
 Bonnie Bernstein (sideline reporter, 2001–2005)
 Jack Buck (play-by-play, 1978–1984, 1987–1995)
 Randy Cross (backup color commentator, 2010)
 Howard David (play-by-play, 1996–2001)
 John Dockery (sideline reporter, 1999–2007)
 Rich Eisen (studio host, 2021–present)
 Boomer Esiason (color commentator, 2000–2017)
 Dan Fouts (backup color commentator, 2011–2013)
 Jim Gray (studio host, 2001–2020)
 Kevin Harlan (backup play-by-play, 2009; play-by-play, 2010–present)
 Matt Millen (color commentator, 1996–2000)
 Warren Moon (backup color commentator, 2009)
 Hank Stram (color commentator, 1978–1984, 1987–1995)
 Lesley Visser (color commentator, 2001)
 Kurt Warner (backup color commentator, 2014–2017, color commentator 2018–present)

Mutual Radio
 Lindsey Nelson (play-by-play, 1974–1977)
 Van Patrick (play-by-play, 1972–1973)

NBC Radio

 Don Criqui (play-by-play, 1985–1986)
 Bob Trumpy (color commentator, 1985–1986)

Lists of National Football League announcers
National Football League on the radio
ABC Sports
Monday Night Football